Trianon sorority was a national collegiate organization that operated in the United States from December 1929 to 1977.

Beginnings 
Trianon was formed from the merger of three college clubs in Ohio and Indiana. First, at the University of Cincinnati, in 1925, Dean Josephine P. Simrall assisted female student in creating the Campus Club. Next, in November 1926, several women formed a similar club on their campus, Butler University. In the spring of 1929, thirty-seven female students at Miami University (of Ohio) formed the Miami Girl's Club.

Members of the three clubs convened on December 28 and 29, 1929 at Butler University, to form Trianon sorority, with December 28 being considered the founding date. This event came to be known as the first National Convention of Trianon.

The ties that bound the members of the three individual clubs were finances and values. " For a long time college campuses felt the need for more democratic social organizations to take care of girls whose principles revolted against fraternities into which only a selected few were bidden and whose dues and fees were outside the limit of the average girl's allowance".

Trianon employed an open membership policy; interested students completed a formal application.

A National Sorority 
Throughout the 1930s, the members of Trianon worked to create official symbols, insignia, rituals, bylaws, and policies. An alumna club and a mother's club were created in 1933. In 1938, however, the Miami chapter struggled to recruit new members; "...several years later it [Miami] had depreciated so in value that the national organization of Trianon was forced to sever relations with this unit".

In the 1940s and 1950s, the sorority maintained two collegiate chapters, Butler and Cincinnati. According to the Trianon Key, members assisted with the war effort during World War II. In 1947, the official sorority manual was printed"a big step in instructing candidates for membership". In 1949, a Life Membership program was offered to alumnae.

In 1957, open membership was no longer permitted. The Trianon pledge manual explained that "the definition of how a girl could become a candidate was changed from a written application to a girl being invited upon a favorable majority vote of active members".

In 1959, the sorority's official magazine creased publication. One year later, the Cincinnati chapter "had only two members but stayed alive".

The sorority was still active in the 1960s. In 1964, the Cincinnati chapter initiated nine new members. A national convention met the following year.

The Trianon pledge manual recorded sorority data through 1967. An honorary member and her husband celebrated their fiftieth wedding anniversary. The National President for 1967–1968 was Rosemary Dudziak Thomas.

In spring 1973, there remained only two active members in the Butler University chapter. Rush was held and four young women pledged the sorority. Because there were not enough active members to act as sorority "mothers", Alumna were used including founding sorority member Priscilla Shearer Smith. The following fall, seven women pledged the sorority. The Butler chapter also pledged and initiated the first sorority member of African-American descent at Butler.

A national convention was held in Nashville, Indiana in the spring of 1974. Some Cincinnati alumnae attended.  Another national convention was held in Covington, Kentucky, just outside Cincinnati.

Demise 
The circumstances and exact dates of the sorority's formal dissolution, if there was such, are unknown. Butler University's archives have their chapter active as of 1974. Nothing is known about the demise of the Cincinnati chapter. All that is definitely known is that Trianon sorority is now a defunct organization.

The Butler chapter was active until at least May 1977. There were still actives in the sorority, but how were they involved is unknown.

Purpose of Trianon 
"The purpose of this organization is to foster democratic ideals on the university of college campus; to encourage and support participation of non-Greek women students in university or college activities; to promote fellowship; to encourage high standards of scholarship; and to serve the university or college in every way possible."

Chapter list
Trianon may have installed up to eight chapters.  Four of these are known, and are as follows. It is unknown whether they used Greek Letter names.

Insignia and traditions
The pledge pin "is of royal blue equilateral triangle each side of which forms part of the base of a gold obtuse angled triangle. This pin is symbolical of the three founding units of the national organization. The blue is for loyalty to school and all things true, and gold is for golden deeds".

The membership pin "is a yellow gold chevron-like base supporting a cluster of peaks upon which the letter T is superimposed. It may be plain or jeweled as follows: four pearls and three blue sapphires in the base; white sapphire or diamond above the T. The pearls arising from the base are symbolic of the other units of the organization. The four pearls in the base represent the four ideals of our organization: democracy, fellowship, scholarship, and service. The three blue sapphires within the points of the base represent the three mother unites of the national organization".

The coat-of-arms was called a crest. "The crest again emphasizes the idea of true friendship. At the top of the crest is a sunbursts rose, the flower of the organization- the rose of truth. Under the rose are clasped hands of friendship, resting on a column denoting strength- a strong friendship. The clasped hands resting on the column forming a T standing on the shield, the shield of courage. At the base we find the motto: We Unite to Build".

The official motto was We Unite to Build.

The flower was the sunburst rose and the colors were royal blue and gold.

Creed 
Trianon, Trianon, in you we do believe. We believe in your work, your success, your ideals. We believe that to every girl who claims you, you are a light that leads the way to friendship, work and healthy fun. We believe in your organization, born in the spirirt of independence and incorporating the high ideals of democracy, friendship, scholarship, and service. And so to you we come with grateful hearts, thankful for the torch you have given us to bear, for friends to cherish, tasks to do, and traditions to carry on through the years. O, Trianon, in you we do believe.

References 

Defunct fraternities and sororities
1929 establishments in Indiana
1977 disestablishments in the United States
Student organizations established in 1929
Organizations disestablished in 1977